Tom Stockley (born 13 June 1994), better known by his stage name T.S. Idiot (often styled T.S. IDIOT) is a punk poet, visual artist and performance artist. He performs poetry as a solo act as well as collaborating with others in musical acts and performance projects. He also performs infrequently as DJ and comedy rapper MC Teabag.

Early life 
Tom Stockley was born in Plymouth, England, in 1994. He attended Falmouth School of Art from 2013 to 2016, where he became known for various public performances and protests, including burning his university degree and posting the ashes back to the institution's Vice Chancellor. He adopted the performing name of T.S. IDIOT after a friend jokingly suggested the pun, in reference to poet and playwright T. S. Eliot. Stockley identifies as queer and has used the pronouns They/Them publicly (as well as He/Him) since 2019.

Career 
In 2014, Stockley began performing poetry at student events alongside his studies at Falmouth School of Art, where he was influenced by 20th century movements including Dada and Situationism and the 'do it yourself' ethos of punk subculture and experimental performance art. He experimented with vocal performances with local musicians, before adopting the moniker T.S. IDIOT in 2015 and performing poetry at punk gigs across the South West. He gained notoriety and featured in national press for burning his degree certificate and issuing a public statement. In 2016 he organised and performed a show with punk poet Attila the Stockbroker, leading Attila to call his work "...a cross between Suicide and John Cooper Clarke".

As the vocalist and co-writer of improvised post-punk band The Hideous Trend, Stockley has been the support act for other first and second-wave punk acts including Auntie Pus, Vic Godard's Subway Sect, T.V. Smith and the Sex Pistols' Glen Matlock.

Stockley is also known for his visual work, often in the form of installations, sculptures, films and collages. He has exhibited works at Back Lane West  and Newlyn Art Gallery, where he was appointed cultural secretary in 2017  in a collaborative project for Tate St. Ives. He is also an alumnus of the UK Young Artists' Cultural Leadership Programme. In 2020 he worked as an artist in the Costume and Wardrobe Department for The Trouble with Maggie Cole.

As a performer and theatre-maker, Stockley performed to an international audience with Doorstep Arts in 2016's Earth Echoes and presented his debut show LOVE/DEATH/OTHER at Fringe TheatreFest in 2017, which reviews called "lighthearted but bittersweet".

Stockley is currently based in Bristol, producing audio work for BBC Radio and writing and performing as T.S. IDIOT.

Theatre Shows
LOVE/DEATH/OTHER (2017)
I'm a Nobody, Get Me Out of Here (2020)
Salt In The Wounds (2021)

Commissions
Palace of Culture (Tate St. Ives) (2016)
Sonnets & Speedos (Victoria Baths) (2017)
L.O.V.E. (Apples & Snakes) (2018)
Leonardo Unfinished: In Conversation (Bristol Museum) (2019)
The New Wild West (BBC Arts) (2020)

Books
Unbound (Arkbound Press) (2017)
The Lockdown Rhythm (Dare To Create) (2020)
Together Behind Four Walls (2020)
Post-Pubescent Protest Poems (2021)

References 

Punk poets
21st-century English poets
21st-century English artists
British spoken word artists
1994 births
Living people
Artists from Plymouth, Devon